Drive or The Drive may refer to:

Motoring
 Driving, the act of controlling a vehicle
 Road trip, a journey on roads

Roadways
Roadways called "drives" may include:
 Driveway, a private road for local access to structures, abbreviated "drive"
 Road, an identifiable thoroughfare, route, way, or path between two places

Science 
 Drive theory, a diverse set of motivational theories in psychology
 Drive reduction theory (learning theory), a theory of learning and motivation
 Prey drive, in the study of animal behavior, the predictable tendency of a carnivore to pursue and capture prey
 Gene drive, in genetics, a type of bias in the inheritance of a gene

Arts, entertainment, and media

Films
 Drive (1997 film), an action film starring Mark Dacascos
 Drive (2002 film), a Japanese film starring Ren Osugi
 Drive (2011 film), an American crime drama film starring Ryan Gosling
 Drive (2019 film), an Indian romantic drama film

Literature
 Drive: The Story of My Life, an autobiography by Larry Bird
 Drive: The Surprising Truth About What Motivates Us, a 2009 book by Daniel H. Pink

Music
 Drive (band), an American metal and hard rock band
 slang for overdrive or distortion, an electronic effect

Albums
 Drive (Alan Jackson album), 2002
 Drive (Anneke van Giersbergen album), 2013
 Drive (Béla Fleck album), 1988
 Drive (Bic Runga album), 1997
 Drive (Gareth Emery album), 2014
 The Drive (album), by Haddaway, 1995
 Drives (Lonnie Smith album), 1970
 Drive (Poisonblack album), 2011
 Drive (Robert Palmer album), 2003
 Drive (Russ Freeman album), 2002
 Drive (Steve Wariner album), 1993
 Drive (Amerie EP), 2016
 Drive (Bic Runga EP), 1995
 Drive (Scott Grimes EP), 2010
 Drive: Glay Complete Best, by Glay, 2000
 Drive: Nike + Original Run, by The Crystal Method, 2006
 Drive, by Roy Ayers, 1992
 Drive, by Stephen Ashbrook, 2001

Songs
 "Drive" (The Cars song), 1984
 "Drive" (Cheyenne Jackson song), 2012
 "Drive" (Clean Bandit and Topic song), 2021
 "Drive" (Client song), 2007
 "Drive" (Cory Marks song), 2020
 "Drive" (Incubus song), 2000
 "Drive" (Miley Cyrus song), 2013
 "Drive" (Miyeon song), 2022
 "Drive" (R.E.M. song), 1992
 "Drive" (Shannon Noll song), 2004
 "Drive (For Daddy Gene)", Alan Jackson, 2002
 "Drive", by Ben Rector, from the album Magic
 "Drive", by Bic Runga, from the album Drive
 "Drive", by Bobby McFerrin, from the album Don't Worry, Be Happy
 "Drive", by Carly Rae Jepsen, from the album Kiss
 "Drive", by The Chevin, from the album Borderland
 "Drive", by Daft Punk
 "Drive", by David Guetta and Black Coffee featuring Delilah Montagu, from the album 7
 "Drive", by The Gaslight Anthem, from the album Sink or Swim
 "Drive", by Geoffrey Williams
 "Drive", by Gretta Ray, from the album Here and Now
 "Drive", by Halsey, from the album Badlands
 "Drive", by Joe 90, from the album Dream This
 "Drive", by Pale Waves, from the album My Mind Makes Noises
 "Drive", by Pepper, from the album Pink Crustaceans and Good Vibrations
 "Drive", by Shortfall, from the album More of Our Stupid Noise, originally from the album It's a Miserable Life
 "Drive", by U-Turn featuring Richard Poon
 "Drive", by Vanessa Hudgens, from the album V
 "Drive", by Yanni, from the album Sensuous Chill
 "Drive (For All Time)", by Westlife, from the album World of Our Own
 "Drive", by Tonight Alive, from the album Limitless

Radio
 Drive (CBC Music), the afternoon program on the CBC Music radio network
 WDRV (The Drive, 97.1 FM), a Chicago classic rock station
 WFLB, a radio station licensed to Laurinburg, North Carolina, United States and called The Drive from 2005 to 2011
 WNMB, a radio station licensed to North Myrtle Beach, South Carolina, United States and called The Drive since 2018 
 WVSC (FM) (103.1 The Drive), a South Carolina classic hits station

Television

Series
 Drive (2007 TV series), a 2007 American action drama
 Drive (2016 TV series), a 2016 British reality series
 Kamen Rider Drive, a 2014–2015 tokusatsu series
 The Drive (TV series), an American documentary series on sports in the Pac-12 Conference

Episodes
 "Drive", a 2013 episode of NCIS: Los Angeles
 "Drive" (Star Trek: Voyager), a 2000 episode of Star Trek: Voyager
 "Drive" (The X-Files), a 1998 episode of The X-Files

Other media
 The Drive (Thomson), a 1916-1917 painting by Tom Thomson
 Drive: the scifi comic, a webcomic by Dave Kellett

Places
 Drive Creek (Ontario), Canada
 Drive Lake (Ontario), Canada
 Lake Shore Drive or "The Drive", an expressway in Chicago

Sports
 Drive or Drive shot, a fast low groundstroke hit to the opponent's backcourt in some racket sports including:
 Tennis
 Pickleball
 Drive (American football), a continuous set of offensive plays
 Drive (baseball), a line drive, and related meanings
 Drive (cricket), a straight-batted shot
 Drive (golf), in golf stroke mechanics, a long-distance shot from the tee
 Grand Rapids Drive, American basketball team
 Greenville Drive, American baseball team
 The Drive, in American football, an offensive series in the January 1987 AFC Championship Game

Technology
 Google Drive, a file service created and developed by Google
 Disk drive, a device implementing a storage mechanisms where data is recorded by various electronic, magnetic, optical, or mechanical changes to a surface layer of one or more rotating disks
 Drive, a spacecraft propulsion device
 Drive, an automobile transmission device
 Drive, in a motor controller, an electronic device providing power to a motor or servo
 List of screw drives, a screw drive
 Variable-frequency drive, a type of adjustable-speed drive

Other uses
 Drive (charity), a campaign to collect items, usually other than money

See also
 Driver (disambiguation)